The M'lang River is a river located in the municipality of M'lang in Cotabato province in the Philippines. It directs from Liguasan Marsh to Pulangi River basin in flow of Mindanao River.

Rivers of the Philippines